This article includes a list of Canadian ambassadors and envoys to Austria. The ambassador is also accredited as Permanent Representative to the International Organizations in Vienna.

Envoys

Ambassadors

See also
Canada–Austria relations

References

Austria
 
Canada